Neoiphinoe ovoidea is a species of small sea snail, a marine gastropod mollusk in the family Capulidae, the cap snails.

References

 Egorov & Alexeyev (1998). Treasure of Russian Shells 2 : 1–36

Capulidae
Gastropods described in 1998